A sailmaker makes and repairs sails for sailboats, kites, hang gliders, wind art, architectural sails, or other structures using sails. A sailmaker typically works on shore in a sail loft; the sail loft has other sailmakers. Large ocean-going sailing ships often had sailmakers in the crew. The sailmaker maintained and repaired sails. This required knowledge of the sailmaker's craft and the tools of the sailmakers loft on shore.

Today, one of a sailmaker's important jobs is to teach people how to set and trim their sails to get the most out of them. Sometimes a sailmaker will accompany the client out on the water and adjust the sails. The modern sailmaker uses computer-aided design and manufacturing  tools. Computer graphics allow the sailmaker to produce a "lines drawing" of the sail. Once the design is complete, the sailmaker can now use a low-power laser to cut the material to the exact shape.

Broadseam

CFD 
Sailmakers have recently started using Computational fluid dynamics (CFD), the study of the flow of fluids over or through physical objects, in order to create more efficient sail or foil shapes in the design process.

After CFD analysis is run, complex data sets can be rendered graphically to enhance understanding of the design's likely results, before sails are ever cut.

Sailmaker's tools

Fid, used to stretch grommets before inserting reinforcement
Sailmaker's palm, an oversized thimble used to drive needles through heavy canvas
beeswax, used on thread
Bench hook, to provide a "third hand" to hold sailcloth taut
Seam rubber, to press folds in to fabric
sailmaker's needles
Sewing machine

See also
 James Forten
 Kite types
 Lowell North
 David Ullman

References

 
Transport occupations
Marine occupations